Hakea rugosa, commonly known as  wrinkled hakea or dwarf hakea, is a shrub of the family Proteaceae native to Australia.  It has sharp needle-shaped leaves and white or cream fragrant flowers in profusion from August to October.

Description
The new growth leaves and branches are covered in flattened, short, silky hairs. The inflorescence consists of densely clustered cream or white flowers in profusion in the leaf axils. Flowering occurs from August to October.

Taxonomy and naming
Hakea rugosa was first described in 1810 by botanist Robert Brown and published the description in Transactions of the Linnean Society of London. The specific epithet (rugosa)  is derived from the Latin, rugosus,-a,-um or  "wrinkle",  giving wrinkled, rugose.

Distribution and habitat
Dwarf hakea  grows on loam or sand in mallee scrub or coastal heath from Eyre Peninsula in South Australia to western Victoria.

References

rugosa
Flora of South Australia
Flora of Victoria (Australia)
Taxa named by Robert Brown (botanist, born 1773)
Plants described in 1810